Hanifa Muhiddinovna Mavlianova (Tajik: Ҳанифа Муҳиддиновна Мавлонова, 30 January 1924 – 24 October 2010) was a soprano opera and concert singer, born in Leninabad, Tajikistan. She was granted a title of People's Artist of the Soviet Union in 1968. She was also a Professor of music from 1978 and served as a Deputy of the Supreme Soviet.

After the Civil war in Tajikistan intensified, Hanifa moved to Moscow where she lived the last years of her life. She succumbed to death after a long illness and died in a Moscow. Her body was then transported to Tajikistan and she was buried in Dushanbe.

References
www.centrasia.ru (Google English translation)

1924 births
2010 deaths
People's Artists of the USSR
20th-century Tajikistani women singers
Tajikistani operatic sopranos
Tajikistani actresses
Soviet women opera singers
People from Khujand
Members of the Supreme Soviet of the Soviet Union
Soviet sopranos